Etruscan was the language of the Etruscan civilization in the ancient region of Etruria (modern Tuscany, western Umbria, northern Latium, Emilia-Romagna, Veneto, Lombardy and Campania) in what is now Italy. Etruscan influenced Latin but was eventually completely superseded by it. The Etruscans left around 13,000 inscriptions that have been found so far, only a small minority of which are of significant length; some bilingual inscriptions with texts also in Latin, Greek, or Phoenician; and a few dozen purported loanwords. Attested from 700 BC to AD 50, the relation of Etruscan to other languages has been a source of long-running speculation and study, with its being referred to at times as an isolate, one of the Tyrsenian languages, and a number of other less well-known theories.

The consensus among linguists and Etruscologists is that Etruscan was a Pre–Indo-European and Paleo-European language, closely related to the Raetic language that was spoken in the Alps, and to the Lemnian language, attested in a few inscriptions on Lemnos.

Grammatically, the language is agglutinating, with nouns and verbs showing suffixed inflectional endings and gradation of vowels. Nouns show five cases, singular and plural numbers, with a gender distinction between animate and inanimate in pronouns.

Etruscan appears to have had a cross-linguistically common phonological system, with four phonemic vowels and an apparent contrast between aspirated and unaspirated stops. The records of the language suggest that phonetic change took place over time, with the loss and then re-establishment of word-internal vowels, possibly due to the effect of Etruscan's word-initial stress.

Etruscan religion influenced that of the Romans, and many of the few surviving Etruscan language artifacts are of votive or religious significance. Etruscan was written in an alphabet derived from the Greek alphabet; this alphabet was the source of the Latin alphabet. The Etruscan language is also believed to be the source of certain important cultural words of Western Europe such as military and person, which do not have obvious Indo-European roots.

History of Etruscan literacy

Etruscan literacy was widespread over the Mediterranean shores, as evidenced by about 13,000 inscriptions (dedications, epitaphs, etc.), most fairly short, but some of considerable length. They date from about 700 BC.

The Etruscans had a rich literature, as noted by Latin authors. Livy and Cicero were both aware that highly specialized Etruscan religious rites were codified in several sets of books written in Etruscan under the generic Latin title . The  dealt with divination by reading entrails from a sacrificed animal, while the  expounded the art of divination by observing lightning. According to the 4th-century Latin writer Maurus Servius Honoratus, a fourth set of Etruscan books existed; dealing with animal gods, but it is unlikely that any scholar living in that era could have read Etruscan. However, only one book (as opposed to inscription), the Liber Linteus, survived, and only because the linen on which it was written was used as mummy wrappings.

In 30 BC, Livy noted that Etruscan was once widely taught to Roman boys, but had since become replaced by the teaching of only Greek, while Varro noted that works of theatre had once been composed in Etruscan.

Demise
The date of extinction for Etruscan is held by scholarship to have been either in the late first century BC, or the early first century AD. Freeman's analysis of inscriptional evidence would appear to imply that Etruscan was still flourishing in the 2nd century BC, still alive in the first century BC, and surviving in at least one location in the beginning of the first century AD; however, the replacement of Etruscan by Latin likely occurred earlier in southern regions closer to Rome.

In southern Etruria, the first Etruscan site to be Latinized was Veii, when it was destroyed and repopulated by Romans in 396 BC. Caere (Cerveteri), another southern Etruscan town on the coast 45 kilometers from Rome, appears to have shifted to Latin in the late 2nd century BC. In Tarquinia and Vulci, Latin inscriptions coexisted with Etruscan inscriptions in wall paintings and grave markers for centuries, from the 3rd century BC until the early 1st century BC, after which Etruscan is replaced by the exclusive use of Latin.

In northern Etruria, Etruscan inscriptions continue after they disappear in southern Etruria. At Clusium (Chiusi), tomb markings show mixed Latin and Etruscan in the first half of the 1st century BC, with cases where two subsequent generations are inscribed in Latin and then the third, youngest generation, surprisingly, is transcribed in Etruscan. At Perugia, monolingual monumental inscriptions in Etruscan are still seen in the first half of the 1st century BC, while the period of bilingual inscriptions appears to have stretched from the 3rd century to the late 1st century BC. The isolated last bilinguals are found at three northern sites. Inscriptions in Arezzo include one dated to 40 BC followed by two with slightly later dates, while in Volterra there is one dated to just after 40 BC and a final one dated to 10–20 AD; coins with written Etruscan near Saena have also been dated to 15 BC. Freeman notes that in rural areas the language may have survived a bit longer, and that a survival into the late 1st century AD and beyond "cannot wholly be dismissed", especially given the revelation of Oscan writing in Pompeii's walls.

Despite the apparent extinction of Etruscan, it appears that Etruscan religious rites continued much later, continuing to use the Etruscan names of deities and possibly with some liturgical usage of the language. In late Republican and early Augustan times, various Latin sources including Cicero noted the esteemed reputation of Etruscan soothsayers. An episode where lightning struck an inscription with the name Caesar, turning it into Aesar, was interpreted to have been a premonition of the deification of Caesar because of the resemblance to Etruscan , meaning 'gods', although this indicates knowledge of a single word and not the language. Centuries later and long after Etruscan is thought to have died out, Ammianus Marcellinus reports that Julian the Apostate, the last pagan Emperor, apparently had Etruscan soothsayers accompany him on his military campaigns with books on war, lightning and celestial events, but the language of these books is unknown. According to Zosimus, when Rome was faced with destruction by Alaric in 408 AD, the protection of nearby Etruscan towns was attributed to Etruscan pagan priests who claimed to have summoned a raging thunderstorm, and they offered their services "in the ancestral manner" to Rome as well, but the devout Christians of Rome refused the offer, preferring death to help by pagans. Freeman notes that these events may indicate that a limited theological knowledge of Etruscan may have survived among the priestly caste much longer. One 19th-century writer argued in 1892 that Etruscan deities retained an influence on early modern Tuscan folklore.

Around 180, the Latin author Aulus Gellius mentions Etruscan alongside the Gaulish language in an anecdote. Freeman notes that although Gaulish was clearly still alive during Gellius' time, his testimony may not indicate that Etruscan was still alive because the phrase could indicate a meaning of the sort of "it's all Greek (incomprehensible) to me".

At the time of its extinction, only a few educated Romans with antiquarian interests, such as Marcus Terentius Varro, could read Etruscan. The Roman emperor Claudius (10 BC – AD 54) is considered to have possibly been able to read Etruscan, and authored a treatise on Etruscan history; a separate dedication made by Claudius implies a knowledge from "diverse Etruscan sources", but it is unclear if any were fluent speakers of Etruscan. Plautia Urgulanilla, the emperor's first wife, was Etruscan.

Etruscan had some influence on Latin, as a few dozen Etruscan words and names were borrowed by the Romans, some of which remain in modern languages, among which are possibly  'vulture',  'trumpet',  'sheath',  'people'.

Geographic distribution
Inscriptions have been found in northwest and west-central Italy, in the region that even now bears the name of the Etruscan civilization, Tuscany (from Latin  'Etruscans'), as well as in modern Latium north of Rome, in today's Umbria west of the Tiber, in Campania and in the Po Valley to the north of Etruria. This range may indicate a maximum Italian homeland where the language was at one time spoken.

Outside Italy, inscriptions have been found in Corsica, Gallia Narbonensis, Greece, the Balkans. But by far, the greatest concentration is in Italy.

Classification

Tyrsenian family hypothesis

In 1998, Helmut Rix put forward the view that Etruscan is related to other members of what he called the "Tyrsenian language family". Rix's Tyrsenian family of languages—composed of Raetic, spoken in ancient times in the eastern Alps, and Lemnian, together with Etruscan—has gained acceptance among scholars. Rix's Tyrsenian family has been confirmed by Stefan Schumacher, Norbert Oettinger, Carlo De Simone, and Simona Marchesini. Common features between Etruscan, Raetic, and Lemnian have been found in morphology, phonology, and syntax. On the other hand, few lexical correspondences are documented, at least partly due to the scant number of Raetic and Lemnian texts. The Tyrsenian family, or Common Tyrrhenic, in this case is often considered to be Paleo-European and to predate the arrival of Indo-European languages in southern Europe. Several scholars believe that the Lemnian language could have arrived in the Aegean Sea during the Late Bronze Age, when Mycenaean rulers recruited groups of mercenaries from Sicily, Sardinia and various parts of the Italian peninsula. Scholars such as Norbert Oettinger, Michel Gras and Carlo De Simone think that Lemnian is the testimony of an Etruscan commercial settlement on the island that took place before 700 BC, not related to the Sea Peoples.

Some scholars think that the Camunic language, an extinct language spoken in the Central Alps of Northern Italy, may be also related to Etruscan and to Raetic.

Superseded theories and fringe scholarship
Over the centuries many hypotheses on the Etruscan language have been developed, many of which have not been accepted or have been considered highly speculative. The interest in Etruscan antiquities and the Etruscan language found its modern origin in a book by a Renaissance Dominican friar, Annio da Viterbo, a cabalist and orientalist now remembered mainly for literary forgeries. In 1498, Annio published his antiquarian miscellany titled  (in 17 volumes) where he put together a theory in which both the Hebrew and Etruscan languages were said to originate from a single source, the "Aramaic" spoken by Noah and his descendants, founders of the Etruscan city Viterbo.

The 19th century saw numerous attempts to reclassify Etruscan. Ideas of Semitic origins found supporters until this time. In 1858, the last attempt was made by Johann Gustav Stickel, Jena University in his . A reviewer concluded that Stickel brought forward every possible argument which would speak for that hypothesis, but he proved the opposite of what he had attempted to do. In 1861, Robert Ellis proposed that Etruscan was related to Armenian, which is nowadays acknowledged as an Indo-European language. Exactly 100 years later, a relationship with Albanian was to be advanced by Zecharia Mayani, but Albanian is also known to be an Indo-European language.

Several theories from the late 19th and early 20th centuries connected Etruscan to Uralic or even Altaic languages. In 1874, the British scholar Isaac Taylor brought up the idea of a genetic relationship between Etruscan and Hungarian, of which also Jules Martha would approve in his exhaustive study  (1913). In 1911, the French orientalist Baron Carra de Vaux suggested a connection between Etruscan and the Altaic languages. The Hungarian connection was revived by Mario Alinei, Emeritus Professor of Italian Languages at the University of Utrecht. Alinei's proposal has been rejected by Etruscan experts such as Giulio M. Facchetti, Finno-Ugric experts such as Angela Marcantonio, and by Hungarian historical linguists such as Bela Brogyanyi.

The idea of a relation between the language of the Minoan Linear A scripts was taken into consideration as the main hypothesis by Michael Ventris before he discovered that, in fact, the language behind the later Linear B script was Mycenean, a Greek dialect. It has been proposed to possibly be part of a wider Paleo-European "Aegean" language family, which would also include Minoan, Eteocretan (possibly descended from Minoan) and Eteocypriot. This has been proposed by Giulio Mauro Facchetti, a researcher who has dealt with both Etruscan and Minoan, and supported by S. Yatsemirsky, referring to some similarities between Etruscan and Lemnian on one hand, and Minoan and Eteocretan on the other. It has also been proposed that this language family is related to the pre-Indo-European languages of Anatolia, based upon place name analysis.

Others have suggested that Tyrsenian languages may yet be distantly related to early Indo-European languages, such as those of the Anatolian branch. More recently, Robert S. P. Beekes argued in 2002 that the people later known as the Lydians and Etruscans had originally lived in northwest Anatolia, with a coastline to the Sea of Marmara, whence they were driven by the Phrygians circa 1200 BC, leaving a remnant known in antiquity as the Tyrsenoi. A segment of this people moved south-west to Lydia, becoming known as the Lydians, while others sailed away to take refuge in Italy, where they became known as Etruscans. This account draws on the well-known story by Herodotus (I, 94) of the Lydian origin of the Etruscans or Tyrrhenians, famously rejected by Dionysius of Halicarnassus (book I), partly on the authority of Xanthus, a Lydian historian, who had no knowledge of the story, and partly on what he judged to be the different languages, laws, and religions of the two peoples. In 2006, Frederik Woudhuizen went further on Herodotus' traces, suggesting that Etruscan belongs to the Anatolian branch of the Indo-European family, specifically to Luwian. Woudhuizen revived a conjecture to the effect that the Tyrsenians came from Anatolia, including Lydia, whence they were driven by the Cimmerians in the early Iron Age, 750–675 BC, leaving some colonists on Lemnos. He makes a number of comparisons of Etruscan to Luwian and asserts that Etruscan is modified Luwian. He accounts for the non-Luwian features as a Mysian influence: "deviations from Luwian [...] may plausibly be ascribed to the dialect of the indigenous population of Mysia." According to Woudhuizen, the Etruscans were initially colonizing the Latins, bringing the alphabet from Anatolia. For both archaeological and linguistic reasons, a relationship between Etruscan and the Anatolian languages (Lydian or Luwian) and the idea that Etruscans were initially colonizing the Latins, bringing the alphabet from Anatolia, have not been accepted, just as the story of the Lydian origin reported by Herodotus is no longer considered trustworthy.

Another proposal, pursued mainly by a few linguists from the former Soviet Union, suggested a relationship with Northeast Caucasian (or Nakh-Daghestanian) languages.

Writing system

Alphabet

The Latin script owes its existence to the Etruscan alphabet, which was adapted for Latin in the form of the Old Italic script. The Etruscan alphabet employs a Euboean variant of the Greek alphabet using the letter digamma and was in all probability transmitted through Pithecusae and Cumae, two Euboean settlements in southern Italy. This system is ultimately derived from West Semitic scripts.

The Etruscans recognized a 26-letter alphabet, which makes an early appearance incised for decoration on a small bucchero terracotta lidded vase in the shape of a cockerel at the Metropolitan Museum of Art, ca. 650–600 BC. The full complement of 26 has been termed the model alphabet. The Etruscans did not use four letters of it, mainly because Etruscan did not have the voiced stops b, d and g; the o was also not used. They innovated one letter for f.

Text
Writing was from right to left except in archaic inscriptions, which occasionally used boustrophedon. An example found at Cerveteri used left to right. In the earliest inscriptions, the words are continuous. From the 6th century BC, they are separated by a dot or a colon, which might also be used to separate syllables. Writing was phonetic; the letters represented the sounds and not conventional spellings. On the other hand, many inscriptions are highly abbreviated and often casually formed, so the identification of individual letters is sometimes difficult. Spelling might vary from city to city, probably reflecting differences of pronunciation.

Complex consonant clusters
Speech featured a heavy stress on the first syllable of a word, causing syncopation by weakening of the remaining vowels, which then were not represented in writing: Alcsntre for Alexandros, Rasna for Rasena. This speech habit is one explanation of the Etruscan "impossible" consonant clusters. Some of the consonants, especially resonants, however, may have been syllabic, accounting for some of the clusters (see below under Consonants). In other cases, the scribe sometimes inserted a vowel: Greek Hēraklēs became Hercle by syncopation and then was expanded to Herecele. Pallottino regarded this variation in vowels as "instability in the quality of vowels" and accounted for the second phase (e.g. Herecele) as "vowel harmony, i.e., of the assimilation of vowels in neighboring syllables".

Phases
The writing system had two historical phases: the archaic from the seventh to fifth centuries BC, which used the early Greek alphabet, and the later from the fourth to first centuries BC, which modified some of the letters. In the later period, syncopation increased.

The alphabet went on in modified form after the language disappeared. In addition to being the source of the Roman and early Oscan and Umbrian alphabets, it has been suggested that it passed northward into Veneto and from there through Raetia into the Germanic lands, where it became the Elder Futhark alphabet, the oldest form of the runes.

Corpus
The Etruscan corpus is edited in the Corpus Inscriptionum Etruscarum (CIE) and Thesaurus Linguae Etruscae (TLE).

Bilingual text
The Pyrgi Tablets are a bilingual text in Etruscan and Phoenician engraved on three gold leaves, one for the Phoenician and two for the Etruscan. The Etruscan language portion has 16 lines and 37 words. The date is roughly 500 BC.

The tablets were found in 1964 by Massimo Pallottino during an excavation at the ancient Etruscan port of Pyrgi, now Santa Severa. The only new Etruscan word that could be extracted from close analysis of the tablets was the word for 'three', .

Longer texts
According to Rix and his collaborators, only two unified (though fragmentary) long texts are available in Etruscan:
 The Liber Linteus Zagrabiensis, which was later used for mummy wrappings in Egypt. Roughly 1,200 words of readable text, mainly repetitious prayers, yielded about 50 lexical items.
 The Tabula Capuana (the inscribed tile from Capua) has about 300 readable words in 62 lines, dating to the fifth century BC.

Some additional longer texts are:
 The lead foils of Punta della Vipera have about 40 legible words having to do with ritual formulae. It is dated to about 500 BC.
 The Cippus Perusinus, a stone slab (cippus) found at Perugia, contains 46 lines and about 130 words.
 The Piacenza Liver, a bronze model of a sheep's liver representing the sky, has the engraved names of the gods ruling different sections.
 The Tabula Cortonensis, a bronze tablet from Cortona, is believed to record a legal contract, with about 200 words. Discovered in 1992, this new tablet contributed the word for 'lake', but not much else.
 The Vicchio stele, found in the 21st season of excavation at the Etruscan Sanctuary at Poggio Colla, believed to be connected with the cult of the goddess Uni, with about 120 letters. Only discovered in 2016, it is still in the process of being deciphered. As an example of difficulties in reading this badly damaged monument, here is Maggiani's attempt at a transliteration and translation of a bit for the beginning of the third block of text (III, 1-3): (vacat) tinaś: θ(?)anuri: unial(?)/ ẹ ṿ ị: zal / ame (akil??) "for Tinia in the xxxx of Uni/xxxx(objects) two / must (akil ?) be..."
 The badly damaged Saint Marinella lead sheet contains traces of 80 words, only half of which can be completely read with certainty, many of which can also be found in the Liber Linteus. It was discovered during the during 1963-1964 excavations at a sanctuary near Saint Marinella near Pyrgi, now in the Villa Giulia Museum in Rome.
 The Lead Plaque of Magliano contains 73 words, including many names of deities.

Inscriptions on monuments

The main material repository of Etruscan civilization, from the modern perspective, is its tombs, all other public and private buildings having been dismantled and the stone reused centuries ago. The tombs are the main source of Etruscan portables, provenance unknown, in collections throughout the world. Their incalculable value has created a brisk black market in Etruscan objets d'art – and equally brisk law enforcement effort, as it is illegal to remove any objects from Etruscan tombs without authorization from the Italian government.

The magnitude of the task involved in cataloguing them means that the total number of tombs is unknown. They are of many types. Especially plentiful are the hypogeal or "underground" chambers or system of chambers cut into tuff and covered by a tumulus. The interior of these tombs represents a habitation of the living stocked with furniture and favorite objects. The walls may display painted murals, the predecessor of wallpaper. Tombs identified as Etruscan date from the Villanovan period to about 100 BC, when presumably the cemeteries were abandoned in favor of Roman ones. Some of the major cemeteries are as follows:
Caere or Cerveteri, a UNESCO site. Three complete necropoleis with streets and squares. Many hypogea are concealed beneath tumuli retained by walls; others are cut into cliffs. The Banditaccia necropolis contains more than 1,000 tumuli. Access is through a door.

Tarquinia, Tarquinii or Corneto, a UNESCO site: Approximately 6,000 graves dating from the Villanovan (ninth and eighth centuries BC) distributed in necropoleis, the main one being the Monterozzi hypogea of the sixth–fourth centuries BC. About 200 painted tombs display murals of various scenes with call-outs and descriptions in Etruscan. Elaborately carved sarcophagi of marble, alabaster, and nenfro include identificatory and achievemental inscriptions. The Tomb of Orcus at the Scatolini necropolis depicts scenes of the Spurinna family with call-outs.
 Inner walls and doors of tombs and sarcophagi
 Engraved steles (tombstones)
 ossuaries

Inscriptions on portable objects

Votives
See Votive gifts.

One example of an early (pre-fifth century bce) votive inscription is on a bucchero oinochoe (wine vase): ṃiṇi mulvaṇịce venalia ṡlarinaṡ. en mipi kapi ṃi(r) ṇuṇai = “Venalia Ṡlarinaṡ gave me. Do not touch me (?), I (am) nunai (an offering?)." This seems to be a rare case from this early period of a female (Venalia) dedicating the votive.

Specula
Specula were cast in bronze as one piece or with a tang into which a wooden, bone, or ivory handle fitted. The reflecting surface was created by polishing the flat side. A higher percentage of tin in the mirror improved its ability to reflect. The other side was convex and featured intaglio or cameo scenes from mythology. The piece was generally ornate.

About 2,300 specula are known from collections all over the world. As they were popular plunderables, the provenance of only a minority is known. An estimated time window is 530–100 BC. Most probably came from tombs.

Many bear inscriptions naming the persons depicted in the scenes, so they are often called picture bilinguals. In 1979, Massimo Pallottino, then president of the Istituto di Studi Etruschi ed Italici initiated the Committee of the Corpus Speculorum Etruscanorum, which resolved to publish all the specula and set editorial standards for doing so.

Since then, the committee has grown, acquiring local committees and representatives from most institutions owning Etruscan mirror collections. Each collection is published in its own fascicle by diverse Etruscan scholars.

Cistae
A cista is a bronze container of circular, ovoid, or more rarely rectangular shape used by women for the storage of sundries. They are ornate, often with feet and lids to which figurines may be attached. The internal and external surfaces bear carefully crafted scenes usually from mythology, usually intaglio, or rarely part intaglio, part cameo.

Cistae date from the Roman Republic of the fourth and third centuries BC in Etruscan contexts. They may bear various short inscriptions concerning the manufacturer or owner or subject matter. The writing may be Latin, Etruscan, or both. Excavations at Praeneste, an Etruscan city which became Roman, turned up about 118 cistae, one of which has been termed "the Praeneste cista" or "the Ficoroni cista" by art analysts, with special reference to the one manufactured by Novios Plutius and given by Dindia Macolnia to her daughter, as the archaic Latin inscription says. All of them are more accurately termed "the Praenestine cistae".

Rings and ringstones
Among the most plunderable portables from the Etruscan tombs of Etruria are the finely engraved gemstones set in patterned gold to form circular or ovoid pieces intended to go on finger rings. Around one centimeter in size, they are dated to the Etruscan apogee from the second half of the sixth to the first centuries BC. The two main theories of manufacture are native Etruscan and Greek. The materials are mainly dark red carnelian, with agate and sard entering usage from the third to the first centuries BC, along with purely gold finger rings with a hollow engraved bezel setting. The engravings, mainly cameo, but sometimes intaglio, depict scarabs at first and then scenes from Greek mythology, often with heroic personages called out in Etruscan. The gold setting of the bezel bears a border design, such as cabling.

Coins
Etruscan-minted coins can be dated between the 5th and 3rd centuries BC. Use of the 'Chalcidian' standard, based on the silver unit of 5.8 grams, indicates that this custom, like the alphabet, came from Greece. Roman coinage later supplanted Etruscan, but the basic Roman coin, the sesterce, is believed to have been based on the 2.5-denomination Etruscan coin. Etruscan coins have turned up in caches or individually in tombs and in excavations seemingly at random, and concentrated, of course, in Etruria.

Etruscan coins were in gold, silver, and bronze, the gold and silver usually having been struck on one side only. The coins often bore a denomination, sometimes a minting authority name, and a cameo motif. Gold denominations were in units of silver; silver, in units of bronze. Full or abbreviated names are mainly Pupluna (Populonia), Vatl or Veltuna (Vetulonia), Velathri (Volaterrae), Velzu or Velznani (Volsinii) and Cha for Chamars (Camars). Insignia are mainly heads of mythological characters or depictions of mythological beasts arranged in a symbolic motif: Apollo, Zeus, Culsans, Athena, Hermes, griffin, gorgon, male sphinx, hippocamp, bull, snake, eagle, or other creatures which had symbolic significance.

Functional categories
Wallace et alia include the following categories, based on the uses to which they were put, on their site: abecedaria (alphabets), artisans' texts, boundary markers, construction texts, dedications, didaskalia (instructional texts), funerary texts, legal texts, other/unclear texts, prohibitions, proprietary texts (indicating ownership), religious texts, tesserae hospitales (tokens that establish "the claim of the bearer to hospitality when travelling").

Phonology
In the tables below, conventional letters used for transliterating Etruscan are accompanied by likely pronunciation in IPA symbols within the square brackets, followed by examples of the early Etruscan alphabet which would have corresponded to these sounds.

Vowels
The Etruscan vowel system consisted of four distinct vowels. The vowels o and u appear to have not been phonetically distinguished based on the nature of the writing system, as only one symbol is used to cover both in loans from Greek (e.g. Greek   > Etruscan  'pitcher').

Consonants

Table of consonants

Etruscan also might have had consonants ʧ and ʧʰ, as they might be represented in the writing by using two letters, like in the word  ('great-nephew' or 'great-grandson'). However, this theory is not widely accepted.

Absence of voiced stops
The Etruscan consonant system primarily distinguished between aspirated and non-aspirated stops. There were no voiced stops. When words from foreign languages were borrowed into Etruscan, voiced stops typically became unvoiced stops; one example is Greek , which became Etruscan  and Latin . Such a lack of voiced stops is not particularly unusual; it is found e.g. in modern Icelandic, in Scottish Gaelic, and in most Chinese languages. Even in English, aspiration is often more important than voice in the distinction of fortis-lenis pairs.

Syllabic theory
Based on standard spellings by Etruscan scribes of words without vowels or with unlikely consonant clusters (e.g. 'of this (gen.)' and  'freeman'), it is likely that  were sometimes syllabic sonorants (cf. English little, button).

Rix postulates several syllabic consonants, namely  and palatal  as well as a labiovelar spirant , and some scholars such as Mauro Cristofani also view the aspirates as palatal rather than aspirated but these views are not shared by most Etruscologists. Rix supports his theories by means of variant spellings such as /, /, /.

Morphology
Etruscan was an agglutinative language, varying the endings of nouns, adjectives, pronouns and verbs with discrete endings for each function. It also had adverbs and conjunctions, whose endings did not vary.

Nouns
Etruscan substantives had five cases—nominative, accusative, genitive, dative, and locative—and two numbers: singular and a plural. Not all five cases are attested for every word. Nouns merge the nominative and accusative; pronouns do not generally merge these. Gender appears in personal names (masculine and feminine) and in pronouns (animate and inanimate); otherwise, it is not marked.

Unlike the Indo-European languages, Etruscan noun endings were more agglutinative, with some nouns bearing two or three agglutinated suffixes. Moreover, Etruscan nouns could bear multiple suffixes from the case paradigm alone: that is, Etruscan exhibited Suffixaufnahme. Pallottino calls this phenomenon "morphological redetermination", which he defines as "the typical tendency ... to redetermine the syntactical function of the form by the superposition of suffixes."

Steinbauer says of Etruscan, "there can be more than one marker ... to design a case, and ... the same marker can occur for more than one case."

 Nominative/accusative case  No distinction is made between nominative and accusative of nouns. The nominative/accusative could act as the subject of transitive and intransitive verbs, but also as the object of transitive verbs, and it was also used to indicate duration of time (e.g.,  'for three years').

 Common nouns use the unmarked root.
 Genitive case  The genitive case had two main functions in Etruscan: the usual meaning of possession (along with other forms of dependency such as family relations), and it could also mark the recipient (indirect object) in votive inscriptions. 
 Pallottino defines two declensions based on whether the genitive ends in -s/-ś or -l. In the -s group are most noun stems ending in a vowel or a consonant: /, /. In the second are names of females ending in i and names of males that end s, th or n: /, /, /. After l or r -us instead of -s appears: /.
According to Rex Wallace, "A few nouns could be inflected with both types of endings without any difference in meaning. Why this should be the case is not clear."
 There is a patronymic ending: -sa or -isa, 'son of', but the ordinary genitive might serve that purpose. In the genitive case, morphological redetermination becomes elaborate. Given two male names, Vel and Avle,  means 'Vel son of Avle'. This expression in the genitive become Vel-uś Avles-la.
 Dative case  Besides the usual function as indirect object ('to/for'), this case could be used as the agent ('by') in passive clauses, and occasionally as a locative. The dative ending is -si: /. (Wallace uses the term 'pertinentive' for this case.)
 Locative case  The locative ending is -θi: /.
This shows both umlaut and an ending -ar. Nouns semantically [-human] used the plural -chve or one of its variants: -cva or -va:  'year',  'years';  ' (pig?)‐offering',  'zusle‐offerings'.

Pronouns
Personal pronouns refer to persons; demonstrative pronouns point out English this, that, there.

Personal
The first-person personal pronoun has a nominative  ('I') and an accusative  ('me'). The third person has a personal form  ('he' or 'she') and an inanimate  ('it'). The second person is uncertain, but some, like the Bonfantes, have claimed a dative singular  ('to thee') and an accusative singular  ('thee').

Demonstrative
Locative singular: ; plural .

Adjectives
Though uninflected for number, adjectives were inflected for case, agreeing with their noun:  'good' versus genitive  'of (the) good...'

Adjectives fall into a number of types formed from nouns with a suffix:

Adverbs
Most Indo-European adverbs are formed from the oblique cases, which become unproductive and descend to fixed forms. Cases such as the ablative are therefore called adverbial. If there is any such widespread system in Etruscan, it is not obvious from the relatively few surviving adverbs.

Conjunctions

The two enclitic coordinate conjunctions ‐ka/‐ca/‐c 'and' and -um/‐m 'and, but' coordinated phrases and clauses, but phrases could also be coordinated without any conjunction (asyndetic).

Verbs
Verbs had an indicative mood, an imperative mood and others. Tenses were present and past. The past tense had an active voice and a passive voice.

Present active

Past or preterite active
Adding the suffix  to the verb root produces a third-person singular active, which has been called variously a "past", a "preterite", a "perfect." In contrast to Indo-European, this form is not marked for person. Examples:  'gives, dedicates' versus  'gave, dedicated';  'lives' versus  'lived'.

Past passive
The third-person past passive is formed with -che: , 'offers/offered/was offered'.

Imperative mood

The imperative was formed with the simple, uninflected root of the verb:  'dedicate!',  'put!',  'speak!' and  'invoke!'). 

The imperative  'take, steal' is found in so‐called anti‐theft inscriptions: 

 (Cm 2.13; fifth century BCE)
'I (am) the bowl of Cupe Althr̥na. Don’t steal me!'

Other modals

Verbs with the suffix ‐a indicated the jussive mood, with the force of commanding, or exhorting (within a subjunctive framework).

'No one should put/make (?) anything here.'

Verbs ending in ‐ri referred to obligatory activities:

'On September twenty six, victims must be offered (?) and sacrificed (?) to Nethuns.'

Participles
Verbs formed participles in a variety of ways, among the most frequently attested being -u in  'dead' from  'die'.

Participles could also be formed with ‐θ. These referred to activities that were contemporaneous with that of the main verb:  '(while) speaking',  '(while) invoking', and  '(while) pouring (?)'.

Postpositions

Typical of SOV agglutinative languages, Etruscan had postpositions rather than prepositions, each governing a specific case.

Vocabulary

Borrowings from Etruscan
Only a few hundred words of the Etruscan vocabulary are understood with some certainty. The exact count depends on whether the different forms and the expressions are included. Below is a table of some of the words grouped by topic.

Some words with corresponding Latin or other Indo-European forms are likely loanwords to or from Etruscan. For example,  'nephew', is probably from Latin (Latin , ; this is a cognate of German , Old Norse ). A number of words and names for which Etruscan origin has been proposed survive in Latin.

At least one Etruscan word has an apparent Semitic/Aramaic origin:  'girl', that could have been transmitted by Phoenicians or by the Greeks. The word  'house' is a false cognate to the Coptic  'house'.

Some of these words still have widespread currency in English and Latin-influenced languages. Other words believed to have a possible Etruscan origin include:

 arena  from  'arena' < , 'arena, sand' < archaic  < Sabine , unknown Etruscan word as the basis for fas- with Etruscan ending -ēna.
All else is speculation.
 market  from Latin , of obscure origin, perhaps Etruscan.
 military  from Latin  'soldier'; either from Etruscan or related to Greek , 'assembled crowd' (compare homily).
 person  from Middle English , from Old French , from Latin , 'mask', probably from Etruscan , 'mask'.
 satellite  from Latin , meaning 'bodyguard, attendant', perhaps from Etruscan . Whatmough considers Latin satteles "as one of our securest Etruscan loans in Latin."

Etruscan vocabulary

Numerals

Much debate has been carried out about a possible Indo-European origin of the Etruscan cardinals. In the words of Larissa Bonfante (1990), "What these numerals show, beyond any shadow of a doubt, is the non-Indo-European nature of the Etruscan language". Conversely, other scholars, including Francisco R. Adrados, Albert Carnoy, Marcello Durante, Vladimir Georgiev, Alessandro Morandi and Massimo Pittau, have proposed a close phonetic proximity of the first ten Etruscan numerals to the corresponding numerals in other Indo-European languages.

The lower Etruscan numerals are (G. Bonfante 2002:96):

Core vocabulary

Sample texts
From Tabula Capuana:
(/ indicates line break; text from Alessandro Morandi Epigrafia Italica Rome, 1982, p.40) 

First section probably for March (lines 1–7): 

  
  
  
  
  
   
  
  

Start of second section for April(starting on line 8):

See also 
 Combinatorial method (linguistics)
 Corpus Inscriptionum Etruscarum
 Etruscan alphabet
 Etruscan civilization
 Etruscan documents
 Liber Linteus – An Etruscan linen book that ended as mummy wraps in Egypt.
 Tabula Cortonensis – An Etruscan inscription.
 Cippus perusinus – An Etruscan inscription.
 Pyrgi Tablets – Bilingual Etruscan-Phoenician golden leaves.
 Etruscan mythology
 Etruscan numerals
 Lemnian language
 List of English words of Etruscan origin
 Raetic language
 Helmut Rix
 Tyrsenian languages

Notes

Bibliography
  Available for preview on Google Books.
  
 Bellelli, Vincenzo & Enrico Benelli (2018). Gli Etruschi. La scrittura, la lingua, la società. Rome: Carrocci Editore, 2018.
  Preview available on Google Books.
 
 
 
 
 
 Maras, Daniele (2013). "Numbers and reckoning: A whole civilization founded upon divisions", in The Etruscan World. Ed. Jean MacIntosh Turfa. Abingdon: Routledge, pp. 478–91. 
 Pallottino, M. (ed.) (1954) Testimonia Linguae Etruscae. Firenze.
  Translated from the Italian by J. Cremona.
 Penney, John H. (2009). "The Etruscan language and its Italic context", in Etruscan by Definition. Eds. Judith Swaddling & Philip Perkins. London: British Museum, pp. 88–93.
 Pfiffig, A.J. (1969) Die etruskische Sprache, Graz. 
  2 vols.
 Whatmough, M.M.T. (1997) "Studies in the Etruscan loanwords in Latin" (Biblioteca di 'Studi Etruschi' 33), Firenze.
 Rix, Helmut (1998). Rätisch und Etruskisch. Innsbruck: Institut für Sprachwissenschaft. 
 
 Rodríguez Adrados, Francisco (2005). "El etrusco como indoeuropeo anatolio: viejos y nuevos argumentos". Emerita, 73 (1): 45–56. 
 
 Torelli, M. (ed.) (2001) The Etruscans. London.
 
 
 Wylin, K. (2000) Il verbo etrusco: Ricerca morfosintattica delle forme usate in funzione verbale. Rome.

Further reading

External links

General
 Etruscan News Online, the Newsletter of the American Section of the Institute for Etruscan and Italic Studies.
Etruscan News back issues, Center for Ancient Studies at New York University.
Etruscology at Its Best, the website of Dr. Dieter H. Steinbauer, in English. Covers origins, vocabulary, grammar and place names.
 .
 The Etruscan Language , the linguistlist.org site. Links to many other Etruscan language sites.
 Materials for the Study of the Etruscan Language prepared by Murray Fowler and Richard George Wolfe. University of Wisconsin Press: 1965.

Inscriptions
 TM Texts Etruscan A list of all texts in Trismegistos.
 ETP: Etruscan Texts Project A searchable database of Etruscan texts.
 Etruscan Inscriptions in the Royal Ontario Museum, article by Rex Wallace displayed at the umass.edu site.

Lexical items
 Etruscan Vocabulary, a vocabulary organized by topic by Dieter H. Steinbauer, in English.
 . A short, one-page glossary with numerals as well.
 . An extensive lexicon compiled from other lexicon sites. Links to the major Etruscan glossaries on the Internet are included.
 Paleoglot: Online Etruscan-English dictionary; summary of Etruscan grammar. A searchable Etruscan-to-English dictionary applet and a summary of Etruscan grammar.

Font
 Etruscan font download site with unicode information
 Etruscan and Early Italic Fonts by James F. Patterson

 
Languages of ancient Italy
Pre-Indo-Europeans
Tyrsenian languages
Languages attested from the 7th century BC
Languages extinct in the 1st century BC
Language isolates of Europe
Extinct languages of Europe